Georg Steindorff (November 12, 1861, Dessau – August 28, 1951, North Hollywood, California) was a German Egyptologist.

Life
Georg Steindorff was a graduate of the Egyptology seminars of the University of Göttingen.  He earned a doctorate in 1884 with a linguistic dissertation on Coptic noun forms.  In 1893, the University of Leipzig appointed him to its chair for Egyptology, which had existed since 1870 and had previously been held by Georg Ebers.  The Egyptian collection was founded by the archaeologist Gustav Seyffarth, but Steindorff built the small training collection that was left to him into a true museum.  On his research trips to Egypt he acquired household and grave furnishings and also small-format artworks.  He also brought larger finds from excavations back to Leipzig with him (for example the limestone head of Queen Nefertiti) with the permission of the then French-run Antiquities Service.

Of particular importance are Steindorff's excavations in Giza, Qau, and Aniba between 1903 and 1931.  The Egyptian Museum possesses many objects that were discovered on these expeditions.  After his retirement in 1934, Steindorff lived another four years in Leipzig before emigrating to the United States in 1939, to avoid persecution as a Jew in Nazi Germany.

He was married to Elise Oppenheimer, sister of Franz Oppenheimer.

External links 
 
 Egyptian Museum at the University of Leipzig 
 Homepage of the Museum 
 

1861 births
1951 deaths
People from Dessau-Roßlau
Jewish emigrants from Nazi Germany to the United States
German Egyptologists
German Protestants
University of Göttingen alumni
German male non-fiction writers
Archaeologists from Saxony-Anhalt